The basilar part of the occipital bone (also basioccipital) extends forward and upward from the foramen magnum, and presents in front an area more or less quadrilateral in outline.

In the young skull this area is rough and uneven, and is joined to the body of the sphenoid by a plate of cartilage.

By the twenty-fifth year this cartilaginous plate is ossified, and the occipital and sphenoid form a continuous bone.

Surfaces 
On its lower surface, about 1 cm. in front of the foramen magnum, is the pharyngeal tubercle which gives attachment to the fibrous raphe of the pharynx.

On either side of the middle line the longus capitis and rectus capitis anterior are inserted, and immediately in front of the foramen magnum the anterior atlantooccipital membrane is attached.

The upper surface, which constitutes the lower half of the clivus, presents a broad, shallow groove which inclines upward and forward from the foramen magnum; it supports the medulla oblongata, and near the margin of the foramen magnum gives attachment to the tectorial membrane

On the lateral margins of this surface are faint grooves for the inferior petrosal sinuses.

Additional images

References

External links

Bones of the head and neck